Scott Freer (born 7 May 1988 in Moortown, England) is a rugby union player for Leeds Carnegie in the Aviva Championship. Freer can play at both Tighthead prop and at Hooker.

References

External links

1988 births
Living people
English rugby union players
Leeds Tykes players
Rugby union players from Leeds
Rugby union props